Franco Andrés Miranda (born 13 May 1985) is an Argentine footballer who played as a left full back.

Career
Miranda signed for St Mirren in August 2007, on loan from Argentine club CAI. He had returned to Argentina from Sweden, where he was with Helsingborg. Miranda has also played for River Plate during his career.

In the 2007/08 close season, he had been training with Scottish Premier League team St Mirren and a one-year loan deal was eventually agreed with them. On 10 August 2007 St Mirren received international clearance to finalise the deal to bring Miranda to the club. Miranda scored on his debut, opening goal of a 2–1 win against Inverness. On 2 September 2007, Miranda scored the only goal for St Mirren in a match against Celtic but scored an own goal as the club was defeated 5–1 heavily. The next game could have been more worse for Miranda when he was sent off for second bookable offense in a 2–0 loss against Dundee United. But after a fine season with the Buddies, his loan spell was extended by a further season in June 2008. Miranda would score twice against Hamilton and Rangers respectively. Miranda's last St Mirren game was a 3–2 defeat against Dundee United at Tannadice in January 2009. Shortly after this game Miranda suffered a knee injury which ended his season and he then left the Buddies in July 2009 to return to Argentina, where he signed for newly promoted Chacarita Juniors. During his time at St.Mirren, Miranda remains a popular figure at the club and became a regular player, playing in the left back position.

At Chacarita Juniors, Miranda made just 6 appearances and at the end of the 2009/10 season he moved on to Argentine Second Division club Independiente Rivadavia, however it appears that he suffered a setback in passing a medical.

Franco agreed to return to St Mirren on 28 August 2012, and flew to Scotland to conclude the deal However, on 10 September 2012, it was confirmed that St Mirren had pulled out of the deal and that they would instead sign Graeme MacGregor and not signing Franco Miranda.

References

External links
 
 Franco Miranda at BDFA

1985 births
Living people
People from Comodoro Rivadavia
Argentine people of Spanish descent
Argentine footballers
Argentine expatriate footballers
Argentine Primera División players
Comisión de Actividades Infantiles footballers
Club Atlético River Plate footballers
Racing Club de Avellaneda footballers
Helsingborgs IF players
St Mirren F.C. players
Scottish Premier League players
Chacarita Juniors footballers
Sportivo Belgrano footballers
Club Atlético Patronato footballers
Instituto footballers
Juventud Unida Universitario players
Tiro Federal footballers
Allsvenskan players
Expatriate footballers in Sweden
Expatriate footballers in Scotland
Argentine expatriate sportspeople in Sweden
Argentine expatriate sportspeople in Scotland
Association football defenders